Carlton is a residential neighbourhood in the Palisades area of north west Edmonton, Alberta, Canada.

According to the 2005 municipal census, the most common type of dwelling in the neighbourhood is the single-family dwelling.  These account for roughly 82% of all residences in the neighbourhood. Most of the remaining residences are duplexes, triplexes, or quadruplexes. Virtually all (97%) the residences are owner-occupied.

The neighbourhood is bounded on the west by 142 Street, on the north by 167 Avenue, and on the south by 153 Avenue.  The boundary on the east is half a block west of 134 Street.

Demographics 

Surrounding neighbourhoods

References

External links 
 Carlton Neighbourhood Profile

Neighbourhoods in Edmonton